Nadjma Ali Nadjim (born 19 September 1994 in Marseille) is a French footballer who plays as a forward for Division 1 Féminine club Le Havre. She has been a member of the France women's national team. She also holds Comorian citizenship.

Biography

Notes

References

External links
 
 
 

1994 births
Living people
Black French sportspeople
Footballers from Marseille
French sportspeople of Comorian descent
French women's footballers
Women's association football forwards
Division 1 Féminine players
FC Girondins de Bordeaux (women) players
Olympique de Marseille (women) players
France women's international footballers
FC Fleury 91 (women) players
Grenoble Foot 38 (women) players